Yokomine is a Japanese surname. Notable people with the surname include:

Sakura Yokomine (born 1985), Japanese golfer
Yoshiro Yokomine (born 1960), Japanese politician

Japanese-language surnames